Fried pies, also known as Fry pies, are mainly dessert pies that are similar to turnovers, except that they are smaller and fried. The fruit filling is wrapped in the dough, similar to the dough of a pie crust.

History
Historically in the American South, fried pies were known as "Crab Lanterns", a term that dates back to at least 1770, and may originate from crab apple pies that had slits for ventilation, thus resembling a lantern. New Hampshire fried pies were popular with U.S. president Franklin Pierce.

Fast food versions have gained popularity more recently. McDonald's apple pies were introduced on the menu in 1968, but in 1992 they were phased out in favor of a baked pie (claimed to be healthier) in the United States. There are some McDonald's restaurants throughout the US and world which still offer the fried pies, including all McDonald's restaurants in the Republic of Ireland, United Kingdom, Japan, and Russia. Flavors include cherry and apple (US mainland), taro, and haupia, (Hawaii), and green bean or red bean (China). The Burger King chain also offers fried pies on its menu, in apple and "wild berry" flavors. Whataburger and Popeyes also offer fried pies.

Hubig's, New Orleans' famous local fried pie maker and the last one of its kind, burned on July 27, 2012, but expects to rebuild. It was the last one from a southeastern chain originated in Ft. Worth, Texas, that did not survive the Great Depression. The owners originally stated that they planned to rebuild the factory as soon as possible. As of 2022, the factory is now finished.

See also
 Doughnut
 Empanada
 Fritter

References

External links
Fried pie recipe from the cooking studio at the John C. Campbell Folk School

Fruit pies
American pies
Fried foods